Giuliano Maffei, O.F.M. or Giuliano Matteis (died 1510) was a Roman Catholic prelate who served as Archbishop of Dubrovnik (1505–1510) and Bishop of Bertinoro (1477–1505).

Biography
Giuliano Maffei was ordained a priest in the Order of Friars Minor. On 24 Jan 1477, he was appointed during the papacy of Pope Sixtus IV as Bishop of Bertinoro. On 18 Apr 1505, he was appointed during the papacy of Pope Julius II as Archbishop of Dubrovnik. He served as Archbishop of Dubrovnik until his death in 1510.

Episcopal succession

References

External links and additional sources
 (for Chronology of Bishops) 
 (for Chronology of Bishops) 
 (for Chronology of Bishops) 
 (for Chronology of Bishops) 

15th-century Italian Roman Catholic bishops
16th-century Roman Catholic bishops in Croatia
Bishops appointed by Pope Sixtus IV
Bishops appointed by Pope Julius II
1510 deaths
Franciscan bishops